Wang Lin (born March 30, 1989 in Hangzhou) is a badminton player from China. Wang Lin was crowned the world champion after winning the gold medal at the 2010 BWF World Championships held at Paris defeating fellow Chinese Wang Xin 21–11, 19–21, 21–13.

In 2006, the 17-year-old, Wang Lin beat Xie Xingfang in the final of the China Masters Super Series.

Shortly after her World Championship triumph in Paris, Wang Lin suffered a severe knee ligament tear during her match against Maria Febe Kusumastuti in China Masters Super Series tournament. The injury was so severe to the extent it ruled out Wang Lin completely from playing for almost six months after her knee operation. From there, her ranking starts to decline and eventually Wang Lin fell out of favour from the first-team line-up as her jittery comeback coincided with the emergence of Wang Shixian and Wang Xin.

After making a comeback, she was clearly far from her best and has not achieved the same success as she once did prior to sustaining the injury. Wang Lin once cited fear of injury recurrence was the one of the main reasons she was not able to play at her best.

On December 4, 2013, she announced her retirement on Tencent Weibo.

Achievements

BWF World Championships 
Women's singles

Asian Championships 
Women's singles

Summer Universiade 
Women's singles

Women's doubles

World Junior Championships 
Girls' singles

Asian Junior Championships 
Girls' singles

BWF Superseries 
The BWF Superseries, launched on 14 December 2006 and implemented in 2007, is a series of elite badminton tournaments, sanctioned by Badminton World Federation (BWF). BWF Superseries has two levels: Superseries and Superseries Premier. A season of Superseries features twelve tournaments around the world, which introduced since 2011, with successful players invited to the Superseries Finals held at the year end.

Women's singles

 BWF Superseries Finals tournament
 BWF Superseries Premier tournament
 BWF Superseries tournament

IBF World Grand Prix 
The World Badminton Grand Prix has been sanctioned by the International Badminton Federation since 1983.

Women's singles

Record against selected opponents 
Record against year-end Finals finalists, World Championships semi-finalists, and Olympic quarter-finalists.

References

External links
BWF Player Profile
badmintoncn.com

Living people
1989 births
Badminton players from Zhejiang
Sportspeople from Hangzhou
Chinese female badminton players
World No. 1 badminton players
Universiade medalists in badminton
Universiade silver medalists for China
Universiade bronze medalists for China
Medalists at the 2007 Summer Universiade